Leucadia is a beach community located in the coastal city of Encinitas, California. Leucadia is known for the relatively secluded beaches in Southern California surf culture.

History

The name Leucadia is of Greek origin as its namesake, Lefkada (Leucadia), is one of the Ionian Islands.  Early in the community's history, a development company based in San Diego gave Leucadia and its streets their Roman-Greco names which include Hymettus, Neptune, Phoebe, and Daphne.

Geography
Leucadia faces the Pacific Ocean. The community is set on a series of bluffs that stretch along much of the length of the North County coastline, a region of San Diego County. Its beaches are located below steep vertical cliffs lending them a relative seclusion.

Economy

In 2003, the Leucadia 101 Main Street Association was created to enhance the economic and civic vitality of Leucadia's Historic North Coast Highway 101 corridor. Notable businesses include Pannikin Coffee & Tea, Haggo's Organic Taco, featured on Food Network's Diners, Drive-Ins, and Dives television show, local-favorite Juanitas Taco Shop, Corner Pizza, in addition to Shatto & Sons—which has been in Leucadia since 1975, a custom t-shirt shop known for their "Keep Leucadia Funky" t-shirts.

References 

Neighborhoods in Encinitas, California
Populated coastal places in California